William Reynolds Gianelli (February 19, 1919 – March 30, 2020) was an American engineer and public servant. He was the 3rd United States Assistant Secretary of the Army (Civil Works) from 1981 to 1984, serving during the Ronald Reagan administration.

Early life
Gianelli was born in Stockton, California in February 1919.  He was educated at the University of California, Berkeley, receiving a B.S. in 1941.  He then served in the United States Army Corps of Engineers from 1941 to 1945, in the midst of World War II.  In this capacity, he was involved in building airfields, water supply facilities, and other construction projects at installations in Hawaii, Saipan, Okinawa, and Korea.  By the end of the war, he had attained the rank of Major.

Early career
After the war, in January 1946, Gianelli took a job in the office of the State Engineer of California.  After ten years in that job, he left for the California Department of Water Resources, becoming staff engineer and special assistant to the director.  In 1959, he became district engineer for the CDWR's southern district.

In 1960, Gianelli left government service and formed a consulting engineering firm, Gianelli & Murray.

Government career
In January 1967, Governor of California Ronald Reagan appointed Gianelli as head of the California Department of Water Resources.  In that capacity, he oversaw the development of the California State Water Project.

Gianelli again left government service in 1973, becoming a consulting engineer.  From 1973 to 1976, he served on the National Commission on Water Quality appointed by President of the United States Richard Nixon and chaired by Nelson Rockefeller.

In 1981, President Ronald Reagan nominated Gianelli as Assistant Secretary of the Army (Civil Works), and, after Senate Confirmation, he held this office from April 1981 until May 1984.  He was chairman of the Panama Canal Commission, the last four years under special Congressional Authorization.

Later life
Gianelli continued to work as a consultant after leaving government service in 1984. In 1997, he joined Dawson & Associates as an advisor on environmental permitting. He served there for more than a decade.

Gianelli was president of the Water Education Foundation, based in Sacramento, Calif., from 1985-1989. He made a major financial donation that helped the Foundation create an educational program for young professionals, which is named the William R. “Bill” Gianelli Water Leaders Class.

References

External links
 William R. Gianelli : The California State Department of Water Resources, 1967-1973 / an interview conducted by Malca Chall in 1985. Berkeley, Calif. : Regional Oral History Office, Bancroft Library, University of California, 1986

1919 births
2020 deaths
American centenarians
Men centenarians
Reagan administration personnel
United States Army officers
Burials at Arlington National Cemetery
United States Army personnel of World War II
University of California, Berkeley alumni